Artcyclopedia is an online database of museum-quality fine art founded by Canadian John Malyon.

Information
The Artcyclopedia only deals with art that can be viewed online, and indexes 2,300 art sites (from museums and galleries), with links to around 180,000 artworks by 8,500 artists. The site has also started to compile a list of art galleries and auction houses.

See also 
 The Artchive
 Web Gallery of Art
 WebMuseum

References

External links 
  of Artcyclopedia – the fine art search engine

Art websites
Virtual art museums and galleries
Scholarly search services
Arts databases
Online databases